The following is the final results of the 1998 World Wrestling Championships. Men's Freestyle competition were held in Tehran, Iran. Men's Greco-Roman competition were held in Gävle, Sweden and Women's competition were held in Poznań, Poland.

Medal table

Team ranking

Medal summary

Men's freestyle

Men's Greco-Roman

Women's freestyle

Participating nations

Men's freestyle
204 competitors from 40 nations participated.

 (2)
 (5)
 (7)
 (8)
 (8)
 (8)
 (6)
 (1)
 (3)
 (3)
 (2)
 (2)
 (1)
 (7)
 (8)
 (2)
 (4)
 (4)
 (7)
 (8)
 (1)
 (8)
 (7)
 (5)
 (1)
 (1)
 (4)
 (8)
 (8)
 (3)
 (8)
 (2)
 (5)
 (8)
 (4)
 (4)
 (8)
 (8)
 (8)
 (7)

Men's Greco-Roman
220 competitors from 49 nations participated.

 (1)
 (5)
 (1)
 (1)
 (7)
 (7)
 (2)
 (7)
 (2)
 (1)
 (3)
 (2)
 (1)
 (6)
 (7)
 (5)
 (7)
 (8)
 (7)
 (1)
 (8)
 (6)
 (5)
 (6)
 (8)
 (5)
 (2)
 (3)
 (3)
 (2)
 (2)
 (5)
 (8)
 (2)
 (5)
 (8)
 (2)
 (3)
 (8)
 (3)
 (8)
 (1)
 (3)
 (2)
 (8)
 (8)
 (8)
 (4)
 (3)

Women's freestyle
86 competitors from 21 nations participated.

 (4)
 (4)
 (2)
 (6)
 (4)
 (2)
 (4)
 (5)
 (2)
 (4)
 (6)
 (3)
 (4)
 (6)
 (6)
 (3)
 (4)
 (1)
 (5)
 (6)
 (5)

References

External links
UWW Database

 
World Wrestling Championships
W
W
W
W
Wrestling
Westling
Wrestling
Sport in Tehran